The 1936–37 Allsvenskan was the third season of the top division of Swedish handball. Seven teams competed in the league. Stockholms-Flottans IF won the league, but the title of Swedish Champions was awarded to the winner of Svenska mästerskapet. IFK Kristianstad were relegated.

League table

Attendance

References 

Swedish handball competitions